Phori Angeline Phetlhe is a South African politician who has been a Member of the National Assembly of South Africa since March 2023.

A member of the African National Congress, Phetlhe unsuccessfully stood for the South African National Assembly in the 2019 general election as a candidate on the party's national list.

Phetlhe was sworn in as a Member of the National Assembly on 15 March 2023.

References

External links

Living people
Year of birth missing (living people)
African National Congress politicians
Members of the National Assembly of South Africa
Women members of the National Assembly of South Africa